The radio spectrum is the part of the electromagnetic spectrum with frequencies from 1 Hz to 3,000 GHz (3 THz). Electromagnetic waves in this frequency range, called radio waves, are widely used in modern technology, particularly in telecommunication. To prevent interference between different users, the generation and transmission of radio waves is strictly regulated by national laws, coordinated by an international body, the International Telecommunication Union (ITU).

Different parts of the radio spectrum are allocated by the ITU for different radio transmission technologies and applications; some 40 radiocommunication services are defined in the ITU's Radio Regulations (RR). In some cases, parts of the radio spectrum are sold or licensed to operators of private radio transmission services (for example, cellular telephone operators or broadcast television stations). Ranges of allocated frequencies are often referred to by their provisioned use (for example, cellular spectrum or television spectrum). Because it is a fixed resource which is in demand by an increasing number of users, the radio spectrum has become increasingly congested in recent decades, and the need to utilize it more effectively is driving modern telecommunications innovations such as trunked radio systems, spread spectrum, ultra-wideband, frequency reuse, dynamic spectrum management, frequency pooling, and cognitive radio.

Limits
The frequency boundaries of the radio spectrum are a matter of convention in physics and are somewhat arbitrary. Since radio waves are the lowest frequency category of electromagnetic waves, there is no lower limit to the frequency of radio waves. Radio waves are defined by the ITU as: "electromagnetic waves of frequencies arbitrarily
lower than 3000 GHz, propagated in space without artificial guide". At the high frequency end the radio spectrum is bounded by the infrared band. The boundary between radio waves and infrared waves is defined at different frequencies in different scientific fields. The terahertz band, from 300 gigahertz to 3 terahertz, can be considered either as microwaves or infrared. It is the highest band categorized as radio waves by the International Telecommunication Union. but spectroscopic scientists consider these frequencies part of the far infrared and mid infrared bands.

Because it is a fixed resource, the practical limits and basic physical considerations of the radio spectrum, the frequencies which are useful for radio communication, are determined by technological limitations which are impossible to overcome. So although the radio spectrum is becoming increasingly congested, there is no possible way to add additional frequency bandwidth outside of that currently in use. The lowest frequencies used for radio communication are limited by the increasing size of transmitting antennas required. The size of antenna required to radiate radio power efficiently increases in proportion to wavelength or inversely with frequency. Below about 10 kHz (a wavelength of 30 km), elevated wire antennas kilometers in diameter are required, so very few radio systems use frequencies below this. A second limit is the decreasing bandwidth available at low frequencies, which limits the data rate that can be transmitted. Below about 30 kHz, audio modulation is impractical and only slow baud rate data communication is used. The lowest frequencies that have been used for radio communication are around 80 Hz, in ELF submarine communications systems built by a few nations' navies to communicate with their submerged submarines hundreds of meters underwater. These employ huge ground dipole antennas 20–60 km long excited by megawatts of transmitter power, and transmit data at an extremely slow rate of about 1 bit per minute (17 millibits per second, or about 5 minutes per character).  

The highest frequencies useful for radio communication are limited by the absorption of microwave energy by the atmosphere. As frequency increases above 30 GHz (the beginning of the millimeter wave band), atmospheric gases absorb increasing amounts of power, so the power in a beam of radio waves decreases exponentially with distance from the transmitting antenna. At 30 GHz, useful communication is limited to about 1 km, but as frequency increases the range at which the waves can be received decreases. In the terahertz band above 300 GHz, the radio waves are attenuated to zero within a few meters, so the atmosphere is essentially opaque.

Bands

A radio band  is a small contiguous section of the radio spectrum frequencies, in which channels are usually used or set aside for the same purpose. To prevent interference and allow for efficient use of the radio spectrum, similar services are allocated in bands. For example, broadcasting, mobile radio, or navigation devices, will be allocated in non-overlapping ranges of frequencies.

For each of these bands the ITU has a bandplan which dictates how it is to be used and shared, to avoid interference and to set protocol for the compatibility of transmitters and receivers.

ITU
As a matter of convention, the ITU divides the radio spectrum into 12 bands, each beginning at a wavelength which is a power of ten (10n) metres, with corresponding frequency of 3×108−n hertz, and each covering a decade of frequency or wavelength. Each of these bands has a traditional name. For example, the term high frequency (HF) designates the wavelength range from 100 to 10 metres, corresponding to a frequency range of 3 to 30 MHz. This is just a symbol and is not related to allocation; the ITU further divides each band into subbands allocated to different services. Above 300 GHz, the absorption of electromagnetic radiation by Earth's atmosphere is so great that the atmosphere is effectively opaque, until it becomes transparent again in the near-infrared and optical window frequency ranges.

These ITU radio bands are defined in the ITU Radio Regulations. Article 2, provision No. 2.1 states that "the radio spectrum shall be subdivided into nine frequency bands, which shall be designated by progressive whole numbers in accordance with the following table".

The table originated with a recommendation of the fourth CCIR meeting, held in Bucharest in 1937, and was approved by the International Radio Conference held at Atlantic City, NJ in 1947. The idea to give each band a number, in which the number is the logarithm of the approximate geometric mean of the upper and lower band limits in Hz, originated with B. C. Fleming-Williams, who suggested it in a letter to the editor of Wireless Engineer in 1942. For example, the approximate geometric mean of band 7 is 10 MHz, or 107 Hz.

IEEE radar bands
Frequency bands in the microwave range are designated by letters. This convention began around World War II with military designations for frequencies used in radar, which was the first application of microwaves. Unfortunately, there are several incompatible naming systems for microwave bands, and even within a given system the exact frequency range designated by a letter may vary somewhat between different application areas. One widely used standard is the IEEE radar bands established by the US Institute of Electrical and Electronics Engineers.

EU, NATO, US ECM frequency designations

Waveguide frequency bands

Comparison of radio band designation standards

Applications

Broadcasting

Broadcast frequencies:
Longwave AM Radio = 148.5 kHz – 283.5 kHz (LF)
Mediumwave AM Radio = 520 kHz – 1700 kHz (MF)
Shortwave AM Radio = 3 MHz – 30 MHz (HF)

Designations for television and FM radio broadcast frequencies vary between countries, see Television channel frequencies and FM broadcast band. Since VHF and UHF frequencies are desirable for many uses in urban areas, in North America some parts of the former television broadcasting band have been reassigned to cellular phone and various land mobile communications systems. Even within the allocation still dedicated to television, TV-band devices use channels without local broadcasters.

The Apex band in the United States was a pre-WWII allocation for VHF audio broadcasting; it was made obsolete after the introduction of FM broadcasting.

Air band
Airband refers to VHF frequencies 118 to 137 MHz, used for navigation and voice communication with aircraft. Trans-oceanic aircraft also carry HF radio and satellite transceivers.

Marine band
The greatest incentive for development of radio was the need to communicate with ships out of visual range of shore. From the very early days of radio, large oceangoing vessels carried powerful long-wave and medium-wave transmitters. High-frequency allocations are still designated for ships, although satellite systems have taken over some of the safety applications previously served by 500 kHz and other frequencies. 2182 kHz is a medium-wave frequency still used for marine emergency communication.

Marine VHF radio is used in coastal waters and relatively short-range communication between vessels and to shore stations. Radios are channelized, with different channels used for different purposes; marine Channel 16 is used for calling and emergencies.

Amateur radio frequencies
Amateur radio frequency allocations vary around the world. Several bands are common for amateurs worldwide, usually in the HF part of the spectrum. Other bands are national or regional allocations only due to differing allocations for other services, especially in the VHF and UHF parts of the radio spectrum.

Citizens' band and personal radio services
Citizens' band radio is allocated in many countries, using channelized radios in the upper HF part of the spectrum (around 27 MHz). It is used for personal, small business and hobby purposes. Other frequency allocations are used for similar services in different jurisdictions, for example UHF CB is allocated in Australia. A wide range of personal radio services exist around the world, usually emphasizing short-range communication between individuals or for small businesses, simplified license requirements or in some countries covered by a class license, and usually FM transceivers using around 1 watt or less.

Industrial, scientific, medical
The ISM bands were initially reserved for non-communications uses of RF energy, such as microwave ovens, radio-frequency heating, and similar purposes. However, in recent years the largest use of these bands has been by short-range low-power communications systems, since users do not have to hold a radio operator's license. Cordless telephones, wireless computer networks, Bluetooth devices, and garage door openers all use the ISM bands. ISM devices do not have regulatory protection against interference from other users of the band.

Land mobile bands
Bands of frequencies, especially in the VHF and UHF parts of the spectrum, are allocated for communication between fixed base stations and land mobile vehicle-mounted or portable transceivers. In the United States these services are informally known as business band radio. See also Professional mobile radio.

Police radio and other public safety services such as fire departments and ambulances are generally found in the VHF and UHF parts of the spectrum. Trunking systems are often used to make most efficient use of the limited number of frequencies available. 
 
The demand for mobile telephone service has led to large blocks of radio spectrum allocated to cellular frequencies.

Radio control

Reliable radio control uses bands dedicated to the purpose. Radio-controlled toys may use portions of unlicensed spectrum in the 27 MHz or 49 MHz bands, but more costly aircraft, boat, or land vehicle models use dedicated radio control frequencies near 72 MHz to avoid interference by unlicensed uses. The 21st century has seen a move to 2.4 GHz spread spectrum RC control systems.

Licensed amateur radio operators use portions of the 6-meter band in North America. Industrial remote control of cranes or railway locomotives use assigned frequencies that vary by area.

Radar
Radar applications use relatively high power pulse transmitters and sensitive receivers, so radar is operated on bands not used for other purposes. Most radar bands are in the microwave part of the spectrum, although certain important applications for meteorology make use of powerful transmitters in the UHF band.

See also

Notes

References
ITU-R Recommendation V.431: Nomenclature of the frequency and wavelength bands used in telecommunications. International Telecommunication Union, Geneva.
IEEE Standard 521-2002: Standard Letter Designations for Radar-Frequency Bands
AFR 55-44/AR 105-86/OPNAVINST 3430.9A/MCO 3430.1, 27 October 1964 superseded by AFR 55-44/AR 105-86/OPNAVINST 3430.1A/MCO 3430.1A, 6 December 1978: Performing Electronic Countermeasures in the United States and Canada, Attachment 1,ECM Frequency Authorizations.

External links
UnwantedEmissions.com A reference to radio spectrum allocations.
"Radio spectrum: a vital resource in a wireless world" European Commission policy.